Under the Dome are an ambient music band from Scotland. They have put out seven albums and also appeared on a live concert album with other similar musicians, with their debut album appearing in 1998.

The group is based around the twin synthesisers of Colin Anderson and Grant Middleton.

Discography
The Demon Haunted World (1998)
Concerts at Jodrell Bank (2000) (live, with Radio Massacre International, Arcane, and Paul Nagle)
Bellerophon (2002)
Colin Woz Ere (2003)
Over The Pond (2003) (live in studio at Radio WXPN, Philadelphia)
Wot No Colin? (2003) (live. Colin Anderson not present; Band consisted of Grant Middleton, Paul Nagle, Andy Bloyce, and Steve Jenkins)
Dome Roots Collection (2004)
Live @ HJ7 (2008)

References

External links
Review of Wot no Colin?, syngate.biz
"Under the Dome", last.fm
"Under the Dome", starsend.com

Ambient music groups
Scottish electronic music groups